Alberto Pérez Pérez (Montevideo, 15 June 1937 - 2 September 2017) was a Uruguayan legal scholar and human rights advocate. 

In the early 1970s he was Dean of the School of Law, University of the Republic. The civic-military dictatorship destituted him and he had to go in exile.

Afterwards he was a member of the Inter-American Court of Human Rights.

References 

1937 births
2017 deaths
People from Montevideo
Uruguayan lawyers
Uruguayan human rights activists
Uruguayan scholars of constitutional law
University of the Republic (Uruguay) alumni
Southern Methodist University alumni
Academic staff of the University of the Republic (Uruguay)
Inter-American Court of Human Rights judges